The Ryokufūkai ("Green Breeze Society") was a political party in Japan.

History
The Ryokufūkai was established in May 1947 by a group of 74 members of the House of Councillors, and within a month, a further 18 members had joined it, meaning it was the largest faction in the chamber. Its formation was an attempt to continue the House of Councillors' tradition of discussing issues in a non-partisan way.

However, the gradual development of a party system made it increasingly difficult for the Ryokufūkai candidates to be elected. The party won only nine seats in the June 1950 elections, reducing it to 50 members. It won 16 seats in the 1953 elections and five in the 1956 elections, by which time it had been reduced to 31 seats in total. It won six seats in the 1959 elections, meaning it had only 11 seats in total. In January 1960 it was dissolved and replaced by the Dōshikai.

References

Defunct political parties in Japan
Political parties established in 1947
1947 establishments in Japan
Political parties disestablished in 1960
1960 disestablishments in Japan